Ed C. Chissus (August 1, 1917 – December 30, 1987) was an American football and baseball coach. He served as the head football coach at his alma mater, Eastern Washington University, from 1953 to 1962, compiling a record of 29–52–4. He also served as the school's head baseball coach, amassing 300 career victories before retiring in 1981.

Chissus died of cancer on December 30, 1987, at Southcrest Convalescent Center, in Spokane, Washington.

Head coaching record

Football

References

1917 births
1987 deaths
American football ends
Eastern Washington Eagles baseball coaches
Eastern Washington Eagles football coaches
Eastern Washington Eagles football players
Deaths from cancer in Washington (state)